Eulepidotis bourgaulti is a moth of the family Erebidae first described by Constant Bar in 1875. It is found in the Neotropical realm, including French Guiana, the Brazilian state of Amazonas and Peru.

References

Moths described in 1875
bourgaulti